NYC Arts, stylized as NYC-ARTS and formerly called Sunday Arts and SundayArts Primetime, is a program dedicated to promoting cultural groups, activities and events in the New York tri-state area produced by and aired by WNET. It is also aired on its sister stations, WLIW in Long Island and NJTV in New Jersey.

The show and its official blog debuted in March 2008 as SundayArts and is hosted by Paula Zahn and Philippe de Montebello with cultural news reports by Christina Ha. The show was renamed from SundayArts to NYC-Arts effective February 2, 2012. The blog also moved to NYC-ARTS.Org. The final episode aired under the SundayArts Primetime banner was January 26, 2012.

On its official website, NYC-ARTS "aims to increase awareness of New York City’s nonprofit cultural organizations, whose offerings greatly benefit residents and visitors—from children to adults, and teenagers to senior citizens" via its various social media platforms, and television shows.

Airtimes
First-run broadcasts
 Thursdays at 8pm /WNET
 Fridays at 7pm /WLIW
Rebroadcasts
 Sundays at Noon /WNET
 Sundays at 3pm / WLIW
 Sundays 8:30pm / NJTV

See also

References

External links
 , the program's official website

2000s American television talk shows
2008 American television series debuts
2010s American television talk shows
English-language television shows
Local talk shows in the United States
Television series about art
Television series by WNET
Television shows filmed in New York City